The Chevrolet Lakewood is a four-door station wagon produced by Chevrolet for the 1961 model year. Chevrolet dropped the "x-wood" names for their station wagon models at the end of 1961 so the 1962 Corvair Station wagons do not continue the Lakewood name.
In appearance, and technical respects it resembled the Volkswagen Type 3 Squareback, but power came from the Corvair's rear-mounted Chevrolet Turbo-Air 6 engine with 146 cu.in. displacement which developed  at 4,400 rpm. The station wagon Corvairs were built on the same unibody as other sedan Corvairs with a 108 in. wheelbase. Standard transmission was a 3-speed manually shifted transaxle.

In 1961 the Lakewood was available in base form as part of the Corvair Lakewood 500 and an "upscale" trim form as the Lakewood 700. In 1962 the base trim level was called Corvair Deluxe series 700 and the top-of-the line model was the Corvair Monza series 900. The Series 900's powertrain "uni-pak" was the same as all Corvairs.  A commonly ordered option on Corvair Station Wagons was the 84 bhp engine connected to a 2 speed Powerglide automatic transaxle.

Production of the Corvair Station Wagon ended in the 1st quarter of calendar year 1962 to make way for the new Monza Convertible body style. In two years 32,120 Station Wagons were made. Only 2,362 of them (model year 1962 only) were Monza Station Wagon models. The 1961 Lakewood 700 was most popular with 20,451 made (64% of all Station Wagons produced).

All 1961 Corvairs came in one of 15 available paint colors. All 1961 Station Wagons had a rubber floor covering with the 700 series having it color keyed to the interior. 
The Monza 900 series was available with optional (extra cost) bucket seats. The upscale Monza series included carpeting and bright trim in the interior. 
Many options were available for the Station Wagon models as they were for the Corvair Sedan.  This included 4-speed transmission, more powerful engine, and comfort and convenience options as well.

References
 Tony Fiore The Corvair Decade, Corvair Society of America, PO Box 68 Maple Plain, MN 55359 www.corvair.org 
 John Gunnell (Editor): Standard Catalog of American Cars 1946-1975, Krause Publications Inc., Iola (2002),

External links

Chevrolet Corvair Lakewood (Internet Movie Cars Database)

Lakewood
Compact cars
Rear-engined vehicles
Rear-wheel-drive vehicles
Station wagons
Motor vehicles manufactured in the United States
Cars introduced in 1961
Cars discontinued in 1963